Carrie Etter (born 1969) is an American poet.

Life
Originally from Normal, Illinois, she moved to Southern California at the age of 19, and on to London in 2001.

Etter holds a BA from the University of California, Los Angeles, and an MFA, MA and PhD from the University of California, Irvine. She was a visiting lecturer at the University of Hertfordshire for 2003–2004, teaching short-story writing and literature.

She was a Reader at Bath Spa University, where she taught between 2004 and 2022. She is currently guiding the new poetry provision in University of Bristol's Masters in Creative Writing.

In the UK, her poems have appeared in The New Statesman, Poetry Review, The Rialto, The Times Literary Supplement, and elsewhere, while in the US her poems have appeared in The Iowa Review, The New Republic, Seneca Review, and many other journals. She is also an essayist and a critic. Her reviews of contemporary poetry have appeared in The Independent, The Guardian, and The Times Literary Supplement, among others. Etter has published essays on Sherman Alexie, Peter Reading and W. B. Yeats.

She won a 2010 London Awards for Art and Performance, the London New Poetry Award for a best first collection published in the UK and Ireland in the preceding year, for The Tethers. In 2013 she received an Authors' Foundation grant from the Society of Authors for work on her third collection, Imagined Sons, which went on to be shortlisted for the Ted Hughes Award for New Work in Poetry by the Poetry Society.

Poetry collections
 Subterfuge of the Unrequitable: Poets & Poets Press, 1998,  (pamphlet/chapbook)
 Yet: Leafe Press, 2008,  (pamphlet/chapbook)
 The Tethers: Seren Books, 2009, 
 The Son: Oystercatcher Press, 2009,  (pamphlet/chapbook)
 Divining for Starters: Shearsman Books, 2011, 
 Imagined Sons: Seren Books, 2014, 
 The Weather in Normal: Seren Books (UK) and Station Hill Press (USA), 2018, ISBN 9781581771749

Anthologies
Carrie Etter (ed) Infinite Difference: Other Poetries by UK Women Poets, Shearsman Books, 2010,

References

External links
 Carrie Etter's personal blog
 Profile at Shearsman

1969 births
American essayists
People from Normal, Illinois
Living people
University of California, Los Angeles alumni
University of California, Irvine alumni
Academics of Bath Spa University
Academics of the University of Hertfordshire
American women poets
Poets from Illinois
American women essayists
Chapbook writers
21st-century American poets
American women academics
21st-century American women writers